Hiram Fuller a.k.a. Hesham Ali Salem (born May 13, 1981) is Libyan former professional basketball player, who grew up in the United States. He is a 6'9" (2.06 m), 268 lb (122 kg) power forward.

Born in East St. Louis, Illinois, he attended Fresno State University after playing at Wabash Valley Junior College and Modesto Junior College. He played in four games for the National Basketball Association's Atlanta Hawks during the 2003-04 NBA season, averaging 2.0 points and 2.8 rebounds.

He played six games for the Utah Jazz during the 2006-07 NBA pre-season.

During the 2009 FIBA Africa Championship for Men, he played for the Libya national basketball team under the name Hesham Ali Salem.

Notes

External links
NBA D-League profile
NBA stats @ basketballreference.com
Latinbasket

1981 births
Living people
Atlanta Hawks players
Basketball players from Illinois
Charleston Lowgators players
Florida Flame players
Fresno State Bulldogs men's basketball players
Libyan men's basketball players
Modesto Junior College alumni
Power forwards (basketball)
Sportspeople from East St. Louis, Illinois
Undrafted National Basketball Association players
Wabash Valley Warriors men's basketball players
Zhejiang Golden Bulls players
Barangay Ginebra San Miguel players
Libyan expatriate basketball people in the Philippines
Philippine Basketball Association imports